The  or Book of Knowledge of All Kingdoms, also known as the Book of All Kingdoms, is an anonymous 14th-century Castilian geographical and armorial  manual (dated to ca. 1385). 
It is written in the form of imaginary autobiographical travelogue of a Castilian mendicant friar, as he travels through the entire world, known and fanciful, from the westernmost Atlantic islands, through Europe, Asia, Africa and the Arctic, identifying all the lands, kings, lords and their armorial devices as he passes them.
The only explicit information is that the anonymous author claims to have been born in Castile in 1305.

The full title is also cited as  "Book of the Knowledge of all the Kingdoms, Lands and Lordships that are in the World, and the arms and devices of each land and lordship, or of the kings and lords who possess them"  (Markham 1912).

The book's principal objective may have been as an armorial roll. Its choice of presenting itself in the form of an imaginary travelogue may have been whimsical, to tap into the fashionable travel literature of the era, popularized by Marco Polo and John Mandeville. 
Its geographical features are closely related to those of the Medici Atlas (notionally dated 1351, but probably c.1370). Also near-contemporary is the Catalan Atlas.

Four manuscripts of the work are known, designated "Z", "N", "R" and "S".

It is believed this was the manuscript that resurfaced in London in 1978, popularly known as Manuscript "Z", currently held by the Bavarian State Library in Munich, as "Cod.hisp. 150". This manuscript, written in the late 14th century, is replete with miniature illuminations drawn by an Aragonese illustrator.  
A facsimile was published in 1999.

Manuscripts "N" and "R"  are kept in the British Library.

This is  the most complete of the extant copies, known as Manuscript "S", kept in the Spanish National Library. In his introduction, the editor presented the book as an authentic travelogue of a Castilian Franciscan mendicant friar written around 1350. However, immediately upon its appearance, contemporary scholars (not without a touch of mockery at the editor) noted the travelogue was largely fantastical and imaginary, and that there was no clear indication that the author was a friar, Franciscan or otherwise.

Notes

References
 Marino, Nancy F., El libro del conoscimiento de todos los reinos = The book of knowledge of all kingdoms,  Arizona Center for Medieval and Renaissance Studies 198 (1999) 
 
 English summary of the Libro del Conoscimiento in National Geographic Magazine (1917) "Heroic Flags of the Middle Ages: the geography of the earth as known in Medieval times, symbolized in 96 historic standards",  National Geographic Magazine, vol. 32, pp. 388–399
 Riquer, Martin de (1987) "La heráldica en el Libro del Conoscimiento y el problema de su datación", Dicenda: cuadernos de Filologia Hispanica, No. 6, p. 313–19 (PDF).
Markham, Clements R., Book of knowledge of all the kingdoms, lands, and lordships that are in the world, and the arms and devices of each land and lordship, or of the kings and lords who possess them (1912) 
María Jesús Lacarra, María del Carmen Lacarra Ducay, Alberto Montaner (eds.), «Libro del Conosçimiento de todos los Regnos et Tierras et Señorios que son por el Mundo, et de las señales et armas que han» Edición facsimilar, transcripción, estudio y notas del Manuscrito Z de la Bayerische Staatsbibliothek, de Munich [Cod. Hisp. 150] procedente de la «Alacena de Zurita», 1999, Zaragoza: Institución "Fernando el Católico" (CSIC)-Excma. Diputación Provincial.

External links 

Book of Knowledge of All Kingdoms, Clements Robert, 1912. Archive.org

Rolls of arms
14th-century books
Old Spanish literature
Travel books
Illuminated heraldic manuscripts
Kingdom of Castile